Aryika, also known as Sadhvi, is a female mendicant (nun) in Jainism.

History 
In the traditional Digambara tradition, a male human being is considered closest to the apex with the potential to achieve liberation, particularly through asceticism. Women must gain karmic merit, to be reborn as man, and only then can they achieve spiritual liberation in the Digambara sect of Jainism. This view is different from the Svetambara sect that believes that women too can achieve liberation from Saṃsāra by being mendicants and through ascetic practices.

According to Svetambara Jain texts, from Kalpasutras onwards, Jainism has had more sadhvis than sadhus (female than male mendicants). In Tapa Gacch of the modern era, the ratio of sadhvis to sadhus (nuns to monks) is about 3.5 to 1. This is much higher, and in contrast to the gender ratio historically observed in Buddhism and Hinduism.

Traditionally, in contrast to Svetambara, the Digambara sect has had far less sadhvis. In contemporary times, some Digambara organizations include sandhvis, but the ratio of sadhvis to sadhus (nuns to monks) has been about 1 to 3.

Conduct 
A Sadhvi, like a Sadhu, enters the mendicant order by making the Five vows: Ahimsa (Non-violence or Non-injury), Satya (Truthfulness), Asteya (Non-stealing), Brahmacharya (Abstinence from sex and sensual pleasures), and Aparigraha (Non-attachment).

Describing the conduct of aryikas, Champat Rai Jain in his book, Sannyāsa Dharma writes: 

Jains supporting the spiritual liberation of womankind note that their conduct is inclusive in such a path: "It is by way of the Three Jewels that one attains moksa. Nowhere in the Agamas is it stated that women are unable to realise these Three Jewels" (the right faith, right knowledge, and right conduct).

Gyanmati

Gyanmati Mataji is a Jain nun having the rank of Ganini Pramukha.

See also
 Jain monasticism
 Jain schools and branches

Notes

References
 
 

Jain monasticism
Jainism and women